Vepris sansibarensis is a species of plant in the family Rutaceae. It is found in Kenya and Tanzania.

References

sans
Flora of Kenya
Flora of Tanzania
Zanzibar
Vulnerable flora of Africa
Taxonomy articles created by Polbot